Recital is a studio album released by jazz pianist Dave Burrell. It was recorded on August 8, 2000, and released in 2001 by the label CIMP. The album is a duet with bassist Tyrone Brown. The album is considered as "simple, yet stately".

Track listing 
"Never Let Me Go" (Livingston) — 8:50
"Struttin' With Some Barbeque" (Hardin) — 5:15
"Samba Rondo (Imagine the Dancers)" (Burrell) — 5:32
"You Go to My Head" (Gillespie) — 8:10
"Dear Mr. Roach" (Brown) — 5:47
"Shortin' Bread" — 6:48
"With a Little Time" (Burrell) — 5:31
"Caravan" (Tizol) — 5:25
"Blue Moon" (Rodgers) — 3:23
"The Crave" (Morton) — 3:46
"Lost Waltz" (Burrell) — 3:41
"Giant Steps" (Coltrane) — 5:20

Personnel 
Dave Burrell — piano
Tyrone Brown — string bass

Reception 

The Penguin Guide to Jazz agrees with Allmusic reference above, calling the album a "simply recorded session." However, they call it "another very fine record from a consistently underrated player." This is likely because "[Burrell] performs with such immaculate precision infused with emotional depth that each piece is a joy to hear," comments AMG reviewer Steven Loewy.

References 

2001 albums
Dave Burrell albums
Instrumental duet albums